Guy's Hill is a settlement in Jamaica. It has a population of 3,198 as of 2009.

References

Populated places in Saint Mary Parish, Jamaica